The 1989 Scottish League Cup final was played on 22 October 1989 at Hampden Park in Glasgow and was the final of the 44th Scottish League Cup competition (Skol Cup). The final was contested by Aberdeen and Rangers for the third season in succession, with Rangers winning the previous two.

Aberdeen won the match 2–1 thanks to a Paul Mason double.

Match details

References

See also
 Aberdeen F.C.–Rangers F.C. rivalry

1989
League Cup Final
Scottish League Cup Final 1989
Scottish League Cup Final 1989
1980s in Glasgow
October 1989 sports events in Europe